Daniel Račić (born 19 September 1997) is an Austrian footballer of Serbian descent who plays for WSC Hertha Wels.

External links
 
 

1997 births
People from Bruck an der Mur
Austrian people of Serbian descent
Living people
Austrian footballers
Association football midfielders
Kapfenberger SV players
2. Liga (Austria) players
Footballers from Styria